Gallagher Square (formerly Park at the Park) is a  park located outside the outfield fence of Petco Park in San Diego, California. It got its current name in December 2019 as part of a multiyear partnership making Gallagher the San Diego Padres' official insurance broker, benefits consultant and risk management services partner.

References

External links
 
 

Parks in San Diego
San Diego Padres